The 2005 Atlantic hurricane season was the most active Atlantic hurricane season in history, until the record was broken 15 years later in 2020. The season broke numerous records at the time, with 28 tropical or subtropical storms recorded. The United States National Hurricane Center named 27 storms, exhausting the annual pre-designated list and resulting in the usage of six Greek letter names, and also identified an additional unnamed storm during a post-season re-analysis. A record 15 storms attained hurricane status, with maximum sustained winds of at least ; of those, a record seven became major hurricanes, which are a Category 3 or higher on the Saffir–Simpson scale. Four storms of this season became Category 5 hurricanes, the highest ranking on the scale.

The four Category 5 hurricanes that developed during the season were: Emily, Katrina, Rita, and Wilma. In July, Emily reached peak intensity in the Caribbean Sea, becoming the first Category 5 hurricane of the season, later weakening and striking Mexico twice. In August, Katrina reached peak winds in the Gulf of Mexico but weakened by the time it struck the U.S. states of Louisiana and Mississippi. The most devastating effects of the season were felt on the Gulf Coast of the United States, where Katrina's storm surge crippled New Orleans, Louisiana, for weeks and devastated the Mississippi coastline. Katrina became the costliest U.S. hurricane, leaving $125 billion in damage and 1,392 deaths. Rita followed in September, reaching peak intensity in the Gulf of Mexico before weakening and hitting near the border of Texas and Louisiana. The season's strongest hurricane, Wilma, became the most intense Atlantic hurricane on record, as measured by barometric pressure. Lasting for ten days in October, Wilma moved over Cozumel, the Yucatán Peninsula, and Florida, causing $19 billion in damage and 48 deaths.

The season's impact was widespread and catastrophic. Its storms caused an estimated 3,912 deaths and approximately $171.7 billion in damage. It was the costliest season on record at the time, until its record was surpassed 12 years later. It also produced the second-highest accumulated cyclone energy (ACE) in the Atlantic basin, surpassed only by the 1933 season. The season officially began on June 1, 2005, and the first storm – Arlene – developed on June 8. Hurricane Dennis in July inflicted heavy damage to Cuba. Hurricane Stan in October was part of a broader weather system that killed 1,668 people and caused $3.96 billion in damage to eastern Mexico and Central America, with Guatemala hit the hardest. The final storm – Zeta – formed in late December and lasted until January 6, 2006.

Seasonal forecasts

Ahead of the formal start of the season, various groups issued forecasts for the number of named storms, hurricanes, and major hurricanes in the upcoming season, including Colorado State University (CSU), the Cuban Institute of Meteorology (InsMet), Tropical Storm Risk (TSR), and the United States National Oceanic and Atmospheric Administration (NOAA). Some forecasts predicted how many tropical cyclones would affect a particular country or territory.

Pre-season forecasts
The first of these forecasts was issued by CSU, which predicted on December 5, 2004 that the season would be above average and feature 11 named storms, 6 hurricanes and 3 intense hurricanes. They also noted that the Caribbean and the entire United States coastline faced an increased risk of a major hurricane making landfall. TSR issued its first forecast a few days later and predicted that the season would feature 9.6 tropical storms, 5.7 hurricanes, 3.3 major hurricanes, and predicted that the accumulated cyclone energy (ACE) rating would be 145.

During January 2005, TSR increased its forecast to 13.9 tropical storms, 7.8 hurricanes, 3.6 major hurricanes, and predicted that the ACE rating would be 157. CSU issued its first updated forecast on April 1, increasing their prediction to 13 tropical storms, 7 hurricanes, and 3 major hurricanes, with a continued risk of a major hurricane landfall in the Caribbean or United States. The increase was based on the Atlantic continuing to warm and a strong belief that El Niño conditions would not persist into the hurricane season. On May 2, the Cuban Institute of Meteorology (InsMet) issued their seasonal forecast, which predicted that the season would feature 13 tropical storms and 7 hurricanes. This was followed on May 16 by NOAA, who predicted a 70% chance of above normal activity, with 12–15 tropical storms, 7–9 hurricanes, and 3–5 major hurricanes. CSU issued its second forecast update on May 31, revising its forecast to 15 named storms, 8 hurricanes and 4 major hurricanes; by this point, the group believed El Niño conditions were unlikely.

Midseason outlooks
In their July forecast update, TSR anticipated that the season would be exceptionally active and well above average; the group increased their forecast to 15.3 tropical storms, 8.8 hurricanes, and 4.1 major hurricanes, with an ACE rating of 190. By the end of July, seven tropical storms and two major hurricanes had developed within the basin, which prompted CSU, InsMet, NOAA and TSR to significantly increase their seasonal forecasts at the start of August. In their August 5 update, CSU predicted that 13 more storms would form, with seven more hurricanes and three more major hurricanes. At the start of September, CSU updated their forecasts and predicted that eight more storms would form, with six more hurricanes and three major hurricanes. By the end of September, 17 named storms had developed, of which nine had developed into hurricanes and four had become major hurricanes. Within their final update for the year, CSU predicted that October would feature three named storms, two hurricanes and one major hurricane.

Seasonal summary

With 28 storms (27 named storms and one unnamed), the 2005 Atlantic hurricane season set a new single-year record for most storms, surpassing the total of 20 from 1933. This record stood until surpassed by the 2020 season, which had 30 storms. A total of 7 named storms formed before August 1, which exceeded the record of 5 set in 1997; this record stood until 2020. The fourth named storm developed at a then-record early date, surpassed in 2012. The fifth though eleventh and the thirteenth and onward named storms developed at then-record early dates that were later surpassed in 2020. Further, the months of July and November set records for number of named storms, with 5 and 3, respectively. The 2005 season featured 15 hurricanes, surpassing the previous record of 12, set in 1969.
Of the 15 hurricanes, 5 formed in September, with the season becoming only the sixth to feature 5 in that month. The 2005 season also featured a record seven major hurricanes, one more than the previous record, set in 1926, 1933, 1950, 1996, and 2004. The four Category 5 hurricanes were also a record. The season's activity was reflected with an ACE rating of 250, the second-highest value on record in the Atlantic basin, after the 1933 season.

The extremely active 2005 hurricane season was a continuation of an extended sequence of active years for tropical activity in the Atlantic. Tropical cyclone activity in the Atlantic Ocean between 1995 and 2004 was more active than any other decade in reliable record. With the exception of two years in which El Niño conditions were prevalent (1997 and 2002), all hurricane seasons were individually above average. This was associated with an active phase of the Atlantic multidecadal oscillation (AMO), with a similar period of elevated tropical activity occurring between 1950 and 1969. The anomalously frequent formation of tropical storms and hurricanes reflected the emergence of unusually warm sea surface temperatures across the tropical Atlantic. The Climate Prediction Center (CPC) predicted in May 2005 that the conditions associated with this active multi-decadal signal would continue into the 2005 hurricane season, providing favorable conditions for tropical cyclogenesis in the tropical Atlantic.

Record activity

Chylek and Lesins (2008) determined that the likelihood of a season generating as much tropical activity as 2005 was less than 1 percent. The consecutive occurrence of hurricane seasons as active as 2004 and 2005 in the Atlantic was unprecedented. While environmental conditions favorable for the development of tropical cyclones were analogous to other active seasons, they were more pronounced and encompassed larger areas in 2005. The CPC determined that this environmental enhancement was primarily driven by four factors: the Atlantic multidecadal oscillation, the reduction of atmospheric convection in the tropical Pacific, record-high sea surface temperatures in the tropical Atlantic and Caribbean, and conducive wind and pressure patterns across the western Caribbean and Gulf of Mexico. The multidecadal oscillation increased the potency of conducive environmental factors for tropical development, including the increased strength of subtropical ridges in the northern and southern Atlantic and the eastern Pacific. This amplified the African easterly jet and enhanced upper-level easterlies, attenuating wind shear detrimental to tropical cyclogenesis across the central tropical Atlantic and the Caribbean. Frequent lulls in convection over the tropical Pacific also contributed to the strength of these ridges, focusing hurricane activity in the Atlantic. Most of the tropical storms and all major hurricanes in the Atlantic in 2005 formed when a lack of convection was present near the International Dateline, while a brief uptick in storms near the International Dateline led to a lull in tropical cyclogenesis in the Atlantic for the first half of August.

The Gulf of Mexico saw record levels of tropical activity in 2005, with 11 named storms entering the basin. The unusual activity was attributed to a persistent high pressure area over the Southeastern United States, the northeastward displacement and amplification of the Intertropical Convergence Zone (ITCZ) over the eastern Pacific, and above average sea surface temperatures in the Gulf of Mexico. These factors reduced vertical wind shear and favored cyclonic flow, creating an environment highly supportive of tropical development. The high pressure area also steered incoming storms into the Gulf of Mexico. In addition, the El Niño–Southern Oscillation (ENSO) was in a neutral phase, lowering the likelihood of storms making landfall on the East Coast of the United States and leading to a concentration of impacts farther west. This focusing mechanism led to a complementary reduction in storms developing close to Cape Verde. During the peak of the 2005 season, the Loop Current – an ocean current that transports warm water from the Caribbean Sea northward into the Gulf of Mexico and offshore the U.S. East Coast – propagated northward, reaching its most poleward point in advance of Hurricane Katrina. This protrusion detached into a warm core ring, or a small region of warm waters to an abnormally deep depth, and began to drift southwest as Hurricane Rita traversed the region. By mid-October, the Loop Current returned to its typical position in the Yucatán Peninsula. This evolution provided enhanced ocean heat content to both hurricanes and was partially responsible for the extreme intensities attained by those cyclones.

In addition to the unusually high amount of tropical activity, the 2005 season also featured an abnormally high amount of storms in the typically inactive early and latter parts of the season. Lowered sea-level atmospheric pressures in the late spring and early summer of 2005 curtailed the strength of trade winds, resulting in a reduction of latent heat loss from the tropical Atlantic and Caribbean. This allowed the persistence of the anomalously warm sea surface temperatures that had contributed to the active 2004 hurricane season; this warmth remained until November 2005. The activity in later parts of the 2005 season was elevated by the unusual development of four tropical cyclones from non-tropical origins over the eastern Atlantic.

In the wake of the season, questions arose regarding the potential impact of global warming on Atlantic hurricane activity. Hurricane experts noted that establishing a conclusive relationship would be difficult given the significant role that natural variability plays on hurricane formation and significantly improved tropical cyclone detection methods compared to decades past. A series of international workshops were established after 2005. After five years of analysis, researchers were unable to confirm whether the recent increase in tropical cyclone activity could be attributed more to climate change than natural variability. Models developed within the workshops projected that the number of tropical cyclones under Category 3 intensity would fall over the 21st century, while the number of intense Category 4–5 hurricanes would increase significantly. One potential hypothesis for these findings was a projected increase in vertical wind shear contradicted by warmer ocean temperatures for hurricanes to utilize. The team also concluded that the amount of precipitation produced by tropical cyclones would increase over the next century. In May 2020, researchers at the National Oceanic and Atmospheric Administration and the University of Wisconsin at Madison built upon this research and, for the first time, established a statistically significant global trend toward more intense tropical cyclones, particularly in the Atlantic basin. The research not only reaffirmed a trend toward stronger, wetter tropical cyclones, but it also identified a trend toward increased rapid intensification events and a general slowing of tropical cyclones' forward motion near land.

Impacts 

The storms of the season were extraordinarily damaging and were responsible for significant loss of life. Total damage is estimated to be about US$171.7 billion, and the seasons' storms contributed to the deaths of 3,912 people. There were a record 15 storms making landfall, including seven storms that struck the United States.

The hardest-hit area was the United States Gulf Coast from eastern Texas to Florida, affected to varying degrees by Arlene, Cindy, Dennis, Katrina, Ophelia, Rita, Tammy, and Wilma. Dennis left $2.23 billion in damage along the Florida Panhandle. Katrina caused catastrophic damage to the Gulf Coast, devastating a long stretch of coast along Louisiana, Mississippi, and Alabama with a  storm surge. Wind damage was reported well inland, slowing down recovery efforts. Storm surge also breached levees in the city of New Orleans, Louisiana, flooding about 80% of the city. Total damage has been estimated at $125 billion, making Katrina the costliest hurricane in U.S. history, surpassing Andrew in 1992 and tying Harvey in 2017. At least 1,392 people were killed by the storm, making it the deadliest hurricane in the U.S. since 1928. Southeastern North Carolina suffered some damage from the slow-moving Ophelia. Rita struck near the border of Louisiana and Texas. The hurricane re-flooded New Orleans (though to a far less degree than Katrina), and caused about $18.5 billion in damage. Wilma caused about $19 billion in damage when it moved across southern Florida in October. The hurricane contributed to 30 deaths, five of whom were killed directly by the storm.

Three hurricanes struck Mexico – Emily, Stan, and Wilma. Emily struck Quintana Roo and Tamaulipas as a major hurricane, causing US$343 million ($3.4 billion MXN) in damage. Stan killed 80 people in Mexico, and damage in the county was estimated at US$1.2 billion ($13.2 billion MXN). Stan was part of a broader weather system across Central America that killed 1,513 people in Guatemala, where damage was estimated at US$996 million. Wilma dropped historic rainfall while drifting across the Yucatán peninsula. It killed four people in the country and left US$454 million ($4.8 billion MXN) in damage.

In the Caribbean, Cuba suffered the effects of Dennis and Wilma. The former killed 16 people and left US$1.4 billion in damage when it struck Cuba twice. Later, Wilma flooded parts of western Cuba, leaving US$704 million in damage. The island of Hispaniola experienced Dennis in July, which killed 56 people in Haiti. Emily killed one person and left US$111 million in damage when it struck Grenada, and later it killed five people on Jamaica. Collectively, Dennis and Emily caused about US$96 million (J$6 billion) in damage to Jamaica. Wilma killed 12 people in Haiti and one in Jamaica. Alpha killed 26 people in the Caribbean. In Central America, Beta killed nine people and caused US$11.5 million in damage when it struck Nicaragua in October. In November, Tropical Storm Gamma killed two people in Bequia in the Grenadines, 34 people in Honduras, and 3 in Belize.

Unusual impacts were felt in Europe and nearby islands. The remnants of Maria caused a landslide in Norway that killed three people. The unnamed subtropical storm in October moved through the Azores. Also in October, Vince became the first recorded tropical cyclone to strike Spain, making landfall at tropical depression intensity. In November, the extratropical remnants of Delta struck the Canary Islands, causing 7 fatalities, with 12 people missing.

Systems

Tropical Storm Arlene

The season's first tropical depression developed north of Honduras on June 8 from the interaction of the ITCZ and a series of tropical waves. A day later it intensified into Tropical Storm Arlene while taking a northward track. On June 10, Arlene struck western Cuba. The storm intensified further in the eastern Gulf of Mexico, reaching winds of  early on June 11. Later that day, the storm moved ashore just west of Pensacola, Florida. Over the next two days, Arlene continued northward through the United States, dissipating over southeastern Canada on June 14.

Arlene left mostly minor damage throughout the United States, estimated at $11.8 million. Storm surge damaged coastal roads in the Florida Panhandle and Alabama. In Miami Beach, Florida, a student died when she was caught in a rip current.

Tropical Storm Bret

Between June 24 and June 27, a tropical wave and weak low-pressure area moved in tandem across Central America and eastern Mexico. The system then reached the Bay of Campeche early on June 28 and quickly organized into a tropical depression that day around 18:00 UTC. Bret moved ashore northeastern Mexico near Tuxpan, Veracruz, around 12:00 UTC, dissipating early on June 30 over San Luis Potosí.

Bret brought heavy rainfall across Mexico, reaching at least  in El Raudal, Veracruz. One person drowned in Cerro Azul, while another death occurred in Naranjos due to cardiac arrest. The floods forced the evacuation of approximately 2,800 people, damaged around 3,000 houses, isolated 66 villages, and caused about $100 million (MXN, US$9.2 million) in damage.

Hurricane Cindy

A tropical depression formed on July 3 in the western Caribbean Sea from a tropical wave that moved off Africa nine days prior. The depression crossed the Yucatán Peninsula and dropped rainfall, reaching  in Cancún. The system entered the Gulf of Mexico, strengthening into Tropical Storm Cindy early on July 5. The hurricane struck southeastern Louisiana and later southern Mississippi. Cindy continued across the southeastern United States and transitioned into an extratropical cyclone on July 7 over The Carolinas; it eventually dissipated over the Gulf of St. Lawrence on July 12.

Across the United States, the hurricane caused $320 million in damage and three fatalities – one in Georgia from flooding, and two in Maryland from a car crash. Across Louisiana, the hurricane left 280,000 people without power. Cindy spawned a large tornado outbreak, including an F2 tornado near Hampton, Georgia, that caused over $40 million in damage at the Atlanta Motor Speedway alone. The same tornado inflicted severe damage to 11 planes and 5 vintage helicopters at Tara Field and impacted hundreds of homes to some degree.

Hurricane Dennis

A tropical wave led to the development of Tropical Depression Four in the southeastern Caribbean late on July 4 and further strengthened into Tropical Storm Dennis early the next day. The storm moved west-northwestward, strengthening into a hurricane on July 6 to the south of Hispaniola. On the next day, Dennis rapidly intensified into a Category 4 hurricane while moving between Jamaica and Haiti. Early on July 8, the hurricane briefly moved over Granma Province in southeastern Cuba. Later on July 8, Dennis moved ashore again in Matanzas Province. The hurricane crossed Cuba entered the Gulf of Mexico on July 9 as a weakened hurricane. Dennis weakened and moved through the southeastern United States, the Ohio Valley, and eventually dissipating on July 18 over Ontario.

The outer rainbands of Dennis produced widespread flooding and landslides in Haiti, killing at least 56 people and leaving US$50 million in damage. Dennis brought torrential rain to Jamaica, reaching  in Mavis Bank. One person died in Jamaica, and damage was estimated at US$31.7 million. The storm's heaviest rainfall occurred in Cuba, reaching , making Dennis the wettest storm for the island since Hurricane Flora of 1963. Across the island, Dennis killed 16 people, and left US$1.4 billion in damage, affecting agriculture, tourist areas, infrastructure, and houses. Dennis moved ashore Florida near where Hurricane Ivan struck ten months prior. Damage from Dennis in the United States totaled $2.545 billion, and there were 15 deaths in the country, all but one in Florida. Rainfall in the United States reached  near Camden, Alabama.

Hurricane Emily

On July 11, a tropical wave spawned a tropical depression east of the Lesser Antilles which quickly intensified into Tropical Storm Emily. Moving westward, Emily strengthened into a minimal hurricane and struck Grenada at that intensity on July 14. Emily broke the record set by Dennis for the strongest Atlantic hurricane before August. A day later, Emily dissipated over land. Emily was the earliest 5th named storm before being surpassed by Tropical Storm Edouard in 2020.

In Grenada, Emily killed one person and caused US$111 million in damage, with thousands of roofs damaged. The hurricane's large circulation also damaged houses in other nearby islands. Heavy rainfall from Emily affected Haiti, killing five people. In Jamaica, Emily produced  of rainfall; associated flooding killed five people on the island. Collectively, Emily and earlier Hurricane Dennis left about US$96 million (J$6 billion) in damage to Jamaica. In Honduras, a man drowned in a river swollen by rains from Emily. Damage was heaviest where Emily made its two landfalls in Mexico, with damage in the country estimated at US$343 million ($3.4 billion MXN). Two helicopter pilots were killed when their aircraft crashed while evacuating offshore oil platforms operated by Pemex. A man in Playa del Carmen was electrocuted to death while preparing for the hurricane. The outskirts of Emily dropped heavy rainfall in southern Texas, damaging about $4.7 million worth of cotton.

Tropical Storm Franklin

Tropical Depression Six formed northeast of the Bahamas on July 21, originating from a tropical wave that exited the coast of Africa on July 10. The depression quickly intensified into Tropical Storm Franklin, but wind shear disrupted the storm's initial development. Three days later the storm passed west of Bermuda. An approaching trough turned Franklin to the northwest and weakened Franklin to a minimal tropical storm. Franklin restrengthened slightly as it accelerated northeastward. On July 30, the storm transitioned into an extratropical cyclone south of Nova Scotia, and a day later it was absorbed by a larger extratropical storm near Newfoundland. Franklin held the record for the earliest sixth named storm until it was broken by Tropical Storm Fay in 2020.

On July 26, Bermuda recorded wind gusts of  while the storm made its closest approach. The storm brought light rainfall to Newfoundland.

Tropical Storm Gert

A tropical wave, the same that spawned Tropical Storm Franklin, moved off Africa on July 10. It tracked west-northwest into the Bay of Campeche on July 23, where it contributed to the development of a tropical depression later that day. As convection increased near the center, the depression intensified into Tropical Storm Gert early on July 24. The cyclone did not persist long over water, instead moving ashore north of Cabo Rojo, Mexico, with  winds early on July 25. It continued inland, affecting the same areas impacted by Hurricane Emily just days prior, and quickly dissipated over high terrain at the end of that day.

Gert dropped heavy rainfall, reaching  in San Luis Potosí. Gert caused about US$6 million ($60 million 2005 MXN) in damage, and resulted in one fatality in Nuevo León. Gert was the earliest seventh named storm until it was surpassed by Tropical Storm Gonzalo in 2020.

Tropical Storm Harvey

Tropical Depression Eight formed on August 2 southwest of Bermuda from a tropical wave that left the African coast on July 22. The depression strengthened into Tropical Storm Harvey on August 3 while moving northeastward. Due to strong wind shear, Harvey initially exhibited subtropical characteristics. After moving away from the island, Harvey attained peak winds of  late on August 4 and continued northeastward for a few days, transitioning into an extratropical storm on August 9. The storm gradually weakened and eventually dissipated northwest of the Azores on August 14. Harvey was the earliest eighth named storm on record before being surpassed by Hurricane Hanna during the 2020 Atlantic hurricane season.

On Bermuda, Harvey dropped  of rainfall at Bermuda International Airport, flooding some roads. Sustained winds on the island reached .

Hurricane Irene

A high-latitude tropical wave led to the genesis of Tropical Depression Nine west of Cabo Verde on August 4. It moved to the northwest without much initial development. On August 7, the depression strengthened into Tropical Storm Irene, only to weaken into a tropical depression again the next day. Irene turned to the west, and later resumed its northwest track. It re-intensified into a tropical storm on August 11. On August 15, the storm turned to the north, passing between Bermuda and North Carolina. On the next day, it strengthened into a hurricane. Irene intensified further after turning to the northeast and later east. An approaching trough weakened Irene and caused it to accelerate northeastward. On August 18, Irene weakened into a tropical storm, and later that day was absorbed by a larger extratropical storm to the southeast of Newfoundland. Rip currents near Long Beach, New York killed a 16-year-old boy. Irene was the earliest ninth named storm on record before being surpassed by Hurricane Isaias in 2020.

Tropical Depression Ten

Tropical Depression Ten formed between the Lesser Antilles and Cabo Verde on August 13 from a tropical wave that entered the Atlantic five days earlier. The depression moved slowly westward in an environment of strong vertical shear. Some weather models predicted relaxing shear and intensification of the system; however, the hostile conditions ripped the system apart, causing the depression to degenerate into a remnant low, and the NHC discontinued advisories on August 14, when no organized deep convection remained. The remnants of Tropical Depression Ten continued drifting northwestward, before degenerating further into a tropical wave north of the Leeward Islands, on August 18. Soon afterward, the low-level and mid-level circulations split, with the mid-level circulation lagging behind to the east. The remnant low-level circulation continued westward, before dissipating near Cuba on August 21. Producing occasional bursts of convection, the mid-level remnant circulation eventually merged with another tropical wave approaching from the east, on August 19. This new system would become Tropical Depression Twelve over the Bahamas and, eventually, Hurricane Katrina.

Tropical Storm Jose

A tropical wave, plausibly the same that spawned Tropical Depression Ten nine days earlier, led to the formation of Tropical Depression Eleven over the Bay of Campeche on August 22. Jose made landfall in the Mexican state of Veracruz near the Laguna Verde Nuclear Power Station on August 23. The cyclone became more organized two hours before making landfall and was forming an eye, but its winds remained under hurricane strength. Jose rapidly weakened and soon dissipated as it moved inland over Mexico. Jose was the earliest 10th named storm until surpassed by Tropical Storm Josephine in 2020.

While drenching Mexico's Gulf coast, Jose forced some 25,000 residents from their homes in Veracruz state and damaged at least 16,000 homes in the state. Jose killed 11 people in Veracruz and 5 in Oaxaca. Damage in Mexico totaled roughly $45 million.

Hurricane Katrina

A tropical depression developed on August 23 from the complex interaction of a tropical wave, the mid-level remnants of Tropical Depression Ten, and a nearby upper-level trough. The depression became a tropical storm on August 24 and a hurricane on August 25, making landfall as a Category 1 hurricane in southeastern Florida. Katrina imparted about $500 million in crop and infrastructure damage to the state. The hurricane quickly crossed Florida and emerged into the Gulf of Mexico. Katrina rapidly intensified to Category 5 status early on August 28, becoming the seventh most intense Atlantic hurricane. Turning northward, the hurricane weakened as it approached the northern Gulf Coast. Katrina then crossed the Breton Sound, making a third and final landfall with  winds near Pearlington, Mississippi. The cyclone quickly weakened after moving inland and became extratropical over Kentucky on August 30.

On August 27, the New Orleans National Weather Service issued an urgent weather bulletin describing potentially catastrophic impacts, comparing Katrina to Hurricane Camille of 1969. A day later, New Orleans mayor Ray Nagin issued the city's first-ever mandatory evacuation. About 80% of the city and 83% of neighboring Jefferson Parish evacuated ahead of the storm. The hurricane left catastrophic damage across southern Louisiana, with more than 300,000 houses damaged or destroyed; most of these were in Orleans Parish. In New Orleans, storm surge breached the levees along the Gulf Intracoastal Waterway and 17th Street and London Avenue Canals, flooding about 80% of the city. Portions of the city remained underwater for 43 days. The Mississippi and Alabama coastlines also suffered catastrophic damage from the storm's  storm surge, with very few structures remaining on the coast of the former. Across the region, the hurricane flooded and ruined about 350,000 vehicles. About 2.4 million people lost access to clean drinking water. Katrina also spawned an outbreak of 62 tornadoes across the eight states in the eastern United States.

Hurricane Katrina imparted catastrophic damage in portions of Louisiana and Mississippi, with overall damage estimated at $173 billion; this makes Katrina the costliest natural disaster in U.S. history. Throughout the United States, Katrina killed 1,392 people, making it one of the deadliest hurricanes in the United States, and the deadliest American hurricane since 1928. The Federal Emergency Management Agency (FEMA) managed the aftermath of the hurricane, and faced criticism for its response time, lack of coordination with state agencies, supply shortages, and insufficient housing for federal workers. Tens of thousands of people lost their jobs following the hurricane. Residents across the New Orleans area suffered health effects, including rashes and respiratory problems, from polluted water and air following the hurricane. Katrina forced about 800,000 people to move temporarily, which was the greatest number of displaced people in the country since the Dust Bowl. The United States federal government spent $110.6 billion in relief, recovery and rebuilding efforts, including $16 billion toward rebuilding houses, which was the nation's largest ever housing recovery project. Within a year of the storm, most of the levees were largely repaired. Various countries and international agencies sent supplies or financial aid to assist in the hurricane response.

Tropical Storm Lee

A tropical wave moved off the coast of Africa on August 24. Strong wind shear prevented much organization, and the depression degenerated into a low pressure area late on August 29. The remnants moved to the north and northeast, steered by a larger non-tropical system to the north. The convection increased on August 31; that day the system regenerated into a tropical depression, which strengthened further into Tropical Storm Lee. The storm attained peak winds of  while located between Bermuda and the Azores. After 12 hours as a tropical storm, Lee weakened back to a tropical depression as it turned to the northwest, steered by the larger non-tropical storm. On September 2, the depression degenerated into a remnant low, which was absorbed by a cold front two days later.

Hurricane Maria

A strong tropical wave entered the eastern Atlantic on August 27. The broad disturbance was initially hindered by strong wind shear but eventually organized into a tropical depression about halfway between the Leeward Islands and Cabo Verde early on September 1. The tropical cyclone moved northwest and steadily organized as upper-level winds became more conducive. It strengthened into Tropical Storm Maria on September 2 and eventually became the sixth hurricane of the season early on September 4. Around the time of its peak, Maria turned to the north and northeast, moving around the subtropical ridge as it gradually weakened. Maria fell to tropical storm intensity on September 9 and became extratropical a day later between Newfoundland and the Azores. The former hurricane re-intensified over the northern Atlantic Ocean, only to weaken before passing near southern Iceland. On September 14, the extratropical storm that was once Maria merged with another extratropical storm while approaching Norway.

The remnants of Maria brought resulted in heavy rainfall to Norway, triggering a landslide in Bergen that killed three people and injured seven others.

Hurricane Nate

A tropical wave left Africa on August 30 and moved into the southwestern Atlantic, where subsequent interaction with an upper-level low led to the genesis of a tropical depression south-southwest of Bermuda on September 5. This depression quickly intensified into Tropical Storm Nate, which moved slowly northeastward. On September 7, Nate intensified into the seventh hurricane of the season. The same trough created unfavorable conditions, causing Nate to weaken quickly back to tropical storm status. On September 10, Nate transitioned into an extratropical storm which was absorbed by a larger extratropical storm near the Azores on September 13.

Canadian Navy ships headed to the U.S. Gulf Coast to help in the aftermath of Hurricane Katrina were slowed down trying to avoid Nate and Ophelia. Rip currents caused by hurricanes Nate and Maria killed one person in New Jersey and severely injured another person.

Hurricane Ophelia

The interplay of a cold front and a trough led to the development of Tropical Depression Sixteen over the northern Bahamas on September 6. The depression strengthened into Tropical Storm Ophelia on September 7 and briefly into a hurricane on September 9 while stalled off the east coast of Florida. Ophelia fluctuated between hurricane and tropical storm intensity for the next week as it meandered off the southeastern United States. On September 14, the northern eyewall moved over the North Carolina coast from Wilmington to Morehead City. After moving away from the state, Ophelia weakened to tropical storm status for a fourth and final time due to stronger wind shear and dry air. The storm accelerated northeastward and passed southeast of Cape Cod. Ophelia transitioned into an extratropical storm on September 18 and subsequently crossed Nova Scotia and Newfoundland, eventually dissipating on September 23 north of the Scandinavian Peninsula.

Ophelia caused significant coastal erosion from the churning waves. The hurricane caused extensive damage in the Outer Banks and around Cape Fear. Damage in the United States was estimated at $70 million. The storm's remnants produced strong winds and heavy rain over Atlantic Canada. Ophelia killed three people – a drowning in Florida from high surf, a traffic fatality in North Carolina, and a death from a fall in Nova Scotia.

Hurricane Philippe

It quickly intensified into Tropical Storm Philippe while taking a track to the north-northwest. Early on September 19, Philippe attained hurricane status and reached peak winds of  a day later. Wind shear from an upper-level low caused the hurricane to weaken back to a tropical storm, exposing the center from the convection. On September 21, Philippe accelerated to the north and began moving around the upper-level low, which had extended to the surface and developed into a non-tropical cyclone. The storm briefly threatened Bermuda as it turned to the northwest and began a counterclockwise loop. On September 23, Philippe weakened to a tropical depression and later a remnant low; it was absorbed by the larger non-tropical cyclone a day later.

The circulation that absorbed Philippe dropped light rainfall on the island, and was responsible for the lowest barometric pressure during the month. When Philippe formed in September 17, Philippe became the earliest 16th named storm on record until the record was broken by 2020's Hurricane Paulette by 10 days.

Hurricane Rita

In mid-September, the southern extent of a stationary front devolved into a trough north of the Leeward Islands. A tropical wave interacted with this feature to form a tropical depression near the Turks and Caicos Islands on September 18. It organized into Tropical Storm Rita later that day. Moving to the west-northwest, the storm's intensification attenuated over the Bahamas before resuming thereafter, becoming a hurricane on September 20 between Cuba and Florida. Rapid intensification ensued as Rita moved into the Gulf of Mexico. The hurricane weakened as it approached the northwest Gulf Coast. It rapidly weakened over land as it turned to the north and northeast, and was later absorbed by an approaching cold front on September 26 over Illinois.

Across the United States, Rita imparted $18.5 billion in damage and killed 120 people, although only seven deaths were directly related to the hurricane. Early in its evolution, Rita flooded houses in northern Cuba and the Florida Keys. Rita's approach to the U.S. Gulf Coast prompted one of the largest mass evacuations in the country's history, with an estimated 3.7 million people fleeing the Texas coast between Corpus Christi and Beaumont. Due in part to high temperatures preceding Rita's landfall and elderly susceptibility to excessive heat, at least 80 people died during the mass evacuation; a coach fire en route to Dallas claimed 23 lives. Rita generated a  storm surge that devastated parts of Cameron Parish in Louisiana, destroying most structures in towns like Cameron and Holly Beach. Storm surge also damaged homes in adjoining Jefferson County in Texas. In New Orleans, Rita produced additional flooding and overtopped levees that had been repaired after Hurricane Katrina a month earlier. Impacts from heavy rainfall, gusty winds, and tornadoes associated with Rita affected much of the lower Mississippi River Valley, and over a million electricity customers lost power.

A third of Cameron Parish's population left the parish following the devastation wrought by Rita.  FEMA granted over $1.3 billion to Louisiana to support recovery efforts; $668.8 million was allocated in the form of public assistance grants for initial recovery measures, and $523.5 million was sent to individuals as part of the agency's Individuals and Households program. Over $1 billion in federal assistance was also disbursed to Texas. Texas' Community Development Block Grant Disaster Recovery Program aided 1.85 million people in addition to supporting longer-term infrastructure repairs.

Tropical Depression Nineteen

On September 30, a tropical wave developed into Tropical Depression Nineteen to the west of Cabo Verde. The newly formed cyclone exhibited deep convection in the southern semicircle, but its cloud pattern quickly deteriorated under the influence of strong wind shear.

Hurricane Stan

A tropical wave emerged from Africa on September 17 and moved across the central Atlantic, hampered by north-northeasterly wind shear. The disturbance eventually traveled into the western Caribbean Sea, where it organized into a tropical depression southeast of Cozumel around 12:00 UTC on October 1. High pressure directed the cyclone toward the west-northwest, and the depression intensified into Tropical Storm Stan shortly before making landfall along the eastern coast of the Yucatan Peninsula. Stan briefly weakened to a tropical depression as it crossed over land, but it regained tropical storm strength over the Bay of Campeche on October 3, when ridging further intensified and forced the storm west-southwest. Rapid intensification ensued, allowing Stan to become a Category 1 hurricane before its second landfall east-southeast of Veracruz early on October 4. Once inland, the system rapidly unraveled over the mountainous terrain of Mexico, dissipating in the state of Oaxaca just after 06:00 UTC on October 5.

Stan killed 80 people in Mexico, and damage in the county was estimated at US$1.2 billion ($13.2 billion MXN). Stan was associated with a larger weather system across eastern Mexico and Central America. Torrential rainfall across this region killed 1,513 people in Guatemala, making it the deadliest natural disaster in the country's history. Damage in Guatemala was estimated at US$996 million. El Salvador's Santa Ana Volcano erupted on October 1, occurring simultaneous to the flooding. The flooding killed 69 people in the country, and damage from the two disasters was estimated at US$355.6 million. In Honduras, the weather system killed seven people and left US$100 million in damage. There were also three deaths in Nicaragua and one in Costa Rica. Road damage in Costa Rica from Stan and earlier Hurricane Rita was estimated at US$57 million (₡28 billion (CRC).

Unnamed subtropical storm

In the post-season analysis, the National Hurricane Center identified an additional subtropical storm that had gone unclassified during the course of the season. In late September, an upper-level low formed west of the Canary Islands and moved westward, organizing into a subtropical depression early on October 4. It quickly intensified into a subtropical storm while curving northeast ahead of an approaching cold front. Early on October 5, the storm merged with the cold front; later that day, its remains were absorbed by a non-tropical low. The low that absorbed the storm would eventually become Hurricane Vince.

Tropical Storm Tammy

On October 5, Tropical Storm Tammy developed east of Florida following the interaction of a tropical wave and an upper-level trough. Tammy weakened as it moved inland, crossing southern Georgia and Alabama. It was absorbed by a larger extratropical storm on October 6. Tammy dropped locally heavy rainfall along its path, causing minor damage. The frontal system that absorbed Tammy was a partial cause for severe flooding in New York, New Jersey and New England that killed 10 people in mid-October.

Subtropical Depression Twenty-Two

The system encountered unfavorable conditions as it turned westward and degenerated into a remnant low on October 10, before becoming extratropical on the following day. The NHC continued to monitor the remnant as it headed towards the East Coast of the United States. The extratropical system transported tropical moisture northward, and was, along with Tropical Storm Tammy, a partial cause of severe flooding in New York, New Jersey and New England during early-to-mid-October. The flooding killed 10 people after  of precipitation fell in some locales.

Hurricane Vince

Subtropical Storm Vince formed in the eastern Atlantic near Madeira on October 8 from the same non-tropical low that absorbed the unnamed subtropical storm. Vince transitioned into a tropical storm on the following day and was upgraded to a hurricane shortly thereafter. Although Vince was a very small and short-lived storm that only briefly reached hurricane strength, it was notable for developing in the northeastern Atlantic, well away from where hurricanes usually form. Vince made landfall on the Iberian Peninsula near Huelva, Spain, on October 11 just after weakening to a tropical depression. Vince was the first tropical cyclone on record to make landfall in Spain. The storm left minor flooding in some areas.

Hurricane Wilma

An upper-level low over the southwestern Atlantic helped facilitate the formation of a large, monsoon-like gyre over the Caribbean Sea in middle October. A series of tropical waves moved into this area of disturbed weather and helped form a low-pressure system that developed into Tropical Depression Twenty-Four southwest of Jamaica on October 15. It intensified into Tropical Storm Wilma two days later. Wilma moved slowly through the warm waters of the western Caribbean Sea and began a period of rapid deepening on October 18 that lasted into the following day. Wilma weakened to Category 4 intensity by the time it made landfall on Cozumel on October 21. It later crossed the northeastern Yucatán Peninsula and emerged into the Gulf of Mexico, turning northeast. The hurricane quickly crossed the state and continued across the western Atlantic Ocean. Wilma transitioned into an extratropical cyclone on October 26, which was absorbed by a larger extratropical storm a day later over Atlantic Canada.

In its formative stages, Wilma's large circulation spread across much of the western Caribbean Sea, killing 12 people in Haiti and one in Jamaica. Wilma set a record in Mexico, and for the entire Western Hemisphere, for the highest 24 hour rainfall total, with  recorded at Isla Mujeres. There were four deaths in Mexico, and nationwide damage was estimated at US$454 million ($4.8 billion MXN). Local and federal troops quelled looting and rioting in Cancún. Cancún's airport was closed to the public in the days after the storm, forcing stranded visitors to fly out of Mérida, Yucatán, the region's closest functioning airport. On November 28, Mexico declared a disaster area for 9 of Quintana Roo's 11 municipalities. Mexico's development bank – Nacional Financiera – provided financial assistance for businesses affected by Wilma and Stan through a $400 million fund (MXN, US$38 million).

A significant storm surge flooded areas of western Cuba, leaving US$704 million in damage. In Florida, Wilma caused $19 billion in damage and killed 30 people; five of the deaths were caused directly by the hurricane. Wilma's storm surge caused the worst flooding in the Florida Keys since Hurricane Betsy in 1965. Wilma inflicted a multi-billion dollar disaster in the Miami metropolitan area, including $2.9 billion in damage in Palm Beach County, $2 billion in Miami-Dade County, and $1.2 billion in Broward County. Numerous homes and businesses experienced some degree of impact, with over 55,000 dwellings and 3,600 workplaces damaged in Palm Beach County alone. On October 24, 2005, the same day Wilma made landfall in Florida, President George W. Bush approved a disaster declaration for 13 Florida counties. FEMA expended $342.5 million to the 227,321 approved applicants. Additionally, public assistance from FEMA totaled over $1.4 billion and grants for hazard mitigation projects exceeded $141.5 million. After leaving Florida, Wilma killed one person and left US$6.4 million in damage to the Bahamas, when it passed northwest of the country.

Tropical Storm Alpha

A tropical wave organized into Tropical Depression Twenty-Five in the eastern Caribbean on October 22. Later that day, the depression strengthened into Tropical Storm Alpha as it moved west-northwestward. Alpha weakened to a tropical depression over Hispaniola's steep mountains. The cyclone emerged into the Atlantic Ocean, where it was absorbed by Hurricane Wilma on October 24. Alpha was the 22nd named system in the 2005 Atlantic hurricane season, breaking the 1933 season's record, and became the first tropical storm to be named using the Greek Alphabet. The storm claimed 26 lives, with more than half of them in Haiti. Alpha destroyed 43 homes and damaged 191 others in Haiti.

Hurricane Beta

Late on October 26, the same tropical wave that spawned Tropical Storm Alpha led to the formation of Tropical Depression Twenty-Six over the southwestern Caribbean Sea. Early the next day, it was upgraded to Tropical Storm Beta. That brought the total number of major hurricanes in the 2005 season to seven, a record breaking achievement. However, Beta weakened to a Category 2 prior to landfall in Nicaragua. The storm rapidly weakened inland and dissipated on October 31.

The Colombian island of Providencia was subjected to hurricane-force winds for several hours as the center of the storm moved very slowly by the island. Reports indicate extensive damage to homes and a loss of communications with the islanders. In Honduras and Nicaragua, over 1,000 structures were damaged by the storm, hundreds of which were destroyed. Overall, Beta caused nine fatalities and more than $15.5 million in damage across four countries.

Tropical Storm Gamma

While passing through the Lesser Antilles, the heavy rainfall caused mudslides, killing two people on Bequia. The remnants of the depression continued westward and moved along the northern shore of Honduras, merging with parts of a larger low pressure system. It is uncertain whether the remnants of Gamma absorbed the low pressure system or vice versa. The storm strengthened and a closed circulation formed on November 18, making Gamma a tropical storm for the second time. After regeneration, and after making landfall over northern Honduras, floods from Gamma killed 34 people in Honduras. Three people died in Belize related to the storm. Gamma meandered in the Caribbean Sea for a short time, until slowly weakening and eventually disintegrating into a remnant low late on November 20. The storm caused 39 deaths in total.

Tropical Storm Delta

Convection developed atop the center of the nascent disturbance two days later, and satellite data suggested that it was acquiring thermodynamic characteristics exhibited by tropical cyclones. On November 22, the NHC classified the low-pressure system as a subtropical storm with the name Delta. Delta took a south-southwestward course and further coalesced its associated showers, leading to its re-designation as a tropical storm on November 23. Delta moved erratically over the next two days and weakened to a low-end tropical storm in response to increasing wind shear. A strengthening trough over western Europe accelerated Delta towards the east-northeast on November 27, concurrent with the brief emergence of an eye and a period of intensification. Delta's tropical characteristics later succumbed to wind shear and cold air, resulting in its extratropical transition on November 28 while i) west-northwest of the western Canary Islands; as an extratropical system, Delta tracked east, passing north of the Canary Islands before moving into Morocco and Algeria on November 29, where it dissipated.

Delta caused severe damage in the Canary Islands and claimed at least seven lives, including six who drowned after boats overturned; there were 12 people missing from the overturned boat. El Dedo de Dios, a geological feature which had been pointing towards the sky for over a millennium and an important landmark for the Canary Islands, was toppled during the storm. Damage throughout the Canary Islands was estimated at €312 million ($364 million 2005 US dollars). Delta also caused power outages, leaving some 200,000 people without power and forcing airports to close down. The remnants of Delta later moved into Morocco, bringing needed rain.

Hurricane Epsilon

A surface low attached to a stationary front formed underneath an upper-level low east of Bermuda on November 27. The surface low detached from the frontal zone and acquired tropical characteristics as deep convection wrapped around its center, leading to the development of Tropical Storm Epsilon early on November 29. The NHC consistently forecast that the storm would weaken; however, Epsilon gradually intensified as it moved westward and later looped to the northeast. The storm attained hurricane status on December 2 as the track shifted to the east. A ridge turned Epsilon to the southwest on December 6. Epsilon lasted as a hurricane until December 7, the most for any Atlantic tropical cyclone in December. Epsilon degenerated into a remnant low on December 8; the circulation dissipated two days later.

Tropical Storm Zeta

Over the next couple of days, the system developed a low-level circulation and atmospheric convection increased as it moved north-westwards, before the NHC classified it as Tropical Storm Zeta during December 30. As a result, Zeta became the second latest-forming tropical cyclone in the Atlantic on record behind Alice of December 1954. Over the next couple of days, the system gradually intensified further in a region of favorable anticyclonic outflow, as it slowly moved west-northwest in response to a mid-level low to the southwest. It weakened on January 2, only to re-intensify to its peak intensity on January 3. Zeta weakened again as it turned westward, degenerating into a remnant low on January 6; the circulation dissipated on the next day to the southeast of Bermuda. Zeta affected the 2005 Atlantic Rowing Race by producing high swells that moved boats off course.

Storm names

The list below highlights the names used in the 2005 Atlantic hurricane season. This was the same list used for the 1999 season, with the exceptions of Franklin and Lee, which replaced Floyd and Lenny. The names not retired from this list were used again in the 2011 season. The names Franklin, Lee, Maria, Nate, Ophelia, Philippe, Rita, Stan, Tammy, Vince and Wilma from the regular list were used for the first (and only, in the cases of Rita, Stan and Wilma) time this year, as were the auxiliary list Greek letter names of  Alpha, Beta, Gamma, Delta, Epsilon and Zeta. The 2005 season was the first Atlantic hurricane season to have storm names beginning with 'V' and 'W'. Also, when the list of 21 storm names pre-approved for the season by the World Meteorological Organization (WMO) was exhausted, 2005 became the first to move into the auxiliary list of names.

Retirement
After the season had ended, the WMO's hurricane committee retired five names: Dennis, Katrina, Rita, Stan and Wilma and replaced them with Don, Katia, Rina, Sean and Whitney for the 2011 season. This surpassed the previous record for the number of hurricane names retired after a single seasonfour, held by the 1955, 1995, 2004 seasons.

There was considerable discussion on the usage of the Greek alphabet. The committee agreed that the usage of the Greek alphabet had a "major important political, economic and social impact globally, which might not have happened if a secondary or circular list of names had been used", and that the Greek alphabet would be used again if the traditional naming list was exhausted. It was also decided that it was not practical to retire a Greek letter. Storms named with Greek letters that would otherwise be eligible for retirement would appear in the retired name list, but have a notation affixed with the circumstances. However, due to the devastation caused by Eta and Iota during the 2020 season, the next season that the auxiliary Greek alphabet had to be used, the WMO decided to discontinue the entire Greek alphabet to avoid any confusion and replaced it with a new auxiliary list of given names to be used, which will allow the names to be retired.

Season effects
A table of the storms that formed during the 2005 Atlantic hurricane season is given below: it includes storm name, duration, peak strength, areas affected, damage, and death total. Damage and deaths include amounts while the storm was extratropical, a wave, or a low. The death toll includes all indirect deaths, such as traffic accidents or electrocutions. Damage figures are in 2005 USD.

See also

 Tropical cyclones in 2005
 List of Atlantic hurricanes
 Atlantic hurricane season
 2005 Pacific hurricane season
 2005 Pacific typhoon season
 2005 North Indian Ocean cyclone season
 South-West Indian Ocean cyclone seasons: 2004–05, 2005–06
 Australian region cyclone seasons: 2004–05, 2005–06
 South Pacific cyclone seasons: 2004–05, 2005–06
 Mediterranean tropical-like cyclone

Notes

References

Further reading

External links

 NHC preliminary summary of 2005 wind speeds and deaths
 National Hurricane Center's 2005 Archive
 Weather Prediction Center's 2005 Advisory Archive
 U.S. Rainfall from Tropical Cyclones in 2005
 U.S. National Climatic Data Center – Atlantic Basin 2005 Accumulated Cyclone Energy (ACE) Index 
 27 Storms: Arlene to Zeta (SVS Animation 3354) – animation of all the tropical storms of the season, omitting the unnamed subtropical storm (NASA/Goddard Space Flight Center Scientific Visualization Studio)

 
Atlantic hurricane seasons
Articles which contain graphical timelines
Articles containing video clips
2005 Atl